The 1973 European Wrestling Championships were held in the men's Freestyle style in Losanna Switzerland 30 March – 4 April 1973; the Greco-Romane style in Helsinki Finland 1 – 4 June 1973.

Medal table

Medal summary

Men's freestyle

Men's Greco-Roman

References

External links
Fila's official championship website

Europe
W
European Wrestling Championships
Euro  
1973 in European sport
Sports competitions in Helsinki
W
Euro